Harry K. Cull (March 2, 1911 – February 2, 2000) was a Michigan politician.

Political life
The Flint City Commission selected him as mayor for the years 1962-64.

References

Mayors of Flint, Michigan
1911 births
2000 deaths
20th-century American politicians